La nipote is a 1974 Italian commedia sexy all'italiana-erotic drama film directed by Nello Rossati and starring Daniele Vargas with Francesca Muzio.

In France, the film was released in an adult version with addition of Italian-produced hardcore sequences and under the title Une Nièce malicieuse in 1980.

Plot
Veneto in the year 1958. Wealthy engineer Luigi Favaretto (Vargas) arrives at his summer retreat to spend a quiet holiday with his dimwitted son Antonio (Roberto Proietti), second wife Zoraide (Annie Carol Edel) who is a former stripper, their voluptuous housemaid Doris (Orchidea De Santis), and Piero (George Ardisson), his friend but also Zoraide's secret lover. However, everything changes when Adele (Muzio), Zoraide's niece comes to stay with them following her mother's demise.

Cast 
 Daniele Vargas: Luigi Favaretto
 Francesca Muzio: Adele
 Annie Carol Edel: Zoraide 'Kiki' Favaretto
 George Ardisson: Piero
 Orchidea De Santis: Doris
 Roberto Proietti: Antonio Favaretto
 Otello Cazzola: the priest
 Ezio Marano: Romeo, the doctor

References

External links

La nipote at Variety Distribution

1974 films
Italian drama films
Commedia sexy all'italiana
Adultery in films
Films set in 1958
Films directed by Nello Rossati
1970s sex comedy films
1974 comedy films
1970s Italian-language films
1970s Italian films